Geralin Thomas is an American organizing consultant. She is best known for her appearances on the television show Hoarders.  She is the proprietor of the company Metropolitan Organizing, based in Cary, North Carolina.

Early life and education

Thomas was born Geralin Henning in 1961 in Grosse Pointe, Michigan. She graduated from the University of North Carolina, Chapel Hill and received a B.A. in art history.

Career

Thomas worked in the travel industry, prior to founding Metropolitan Organizing, LLC, in 2002.

Thomas appeared on Time Makeover for the Fine Living Network. She appeared in 22 episodes of Hoarders on A & E from 2009-2012. She also appeared on The Nate Berkus Show, The Joy Behar Show, Today, and Time Makeover.

Thomas has been interviewed for a number of radio shows on a variety of subjects related to hoarding and professional organizing including, Time Management Radio, Blog Talk Radio and Sunny 93 FM.

Thomas joined the National Association of Professional Organizers (NAPO) in August 2003, the organization's name was changed to National Association of Productivity and Organizing Professionals in 2017. She has been an instructor for NAPO since 2006. Thomas served as Vice President of the NAPO-NC chapter from 2004-2007 and as President from 2007-2008.

In 2009, Thomas became a Certified Professional Organizer in Chronic Disorganization and in 2013 was named the Best Chronic Disorganization Specialist at the 7th annual Organizing Awards presented by NAPO-Los Angeles.

Thomas maintains a blog where she interviews organizing experts. She was a contributor to the Clutter Diet from 2008 until 2011.

Thomas' advice on hoarding disorder and professional organizing is regularly quoted in newspapers, magazines, publications and other print media including: Huffington Post, TV Guide and Experience Life Magazine. She has also written articles for various magazines.

Books 
 Thomas, Geralin. Decluttering Your Home: Tips, Techniques & Trade Secrets (September 2015). Firefly Books. .
 Thomas, Geralin. From Hoarding to Hope: Understanding People Who Hoard and How to Help Them (April 2015).  
 She is referenced in Dirty Secret: A Daughter Comes Clean About Her Mother's Compulsive Hoarding and The ICD Guide to Collaborating with Professional Organizers.

Personal life 
In 1988 married attorney William Thomas. They have two sons.

References

External links 
 Geralin Thomas Official Website 
 
 National Association of Productivity and Organizing Professionals (NAPO)
 Related: Hoarders
 Related: Professional Organizing

1961 births
Living people
American television personalities
American women television personalities
21st-century American businesspeople
Compulsive hoarding